George Marshall Kissell (9 September 1920 – 7 October 2008) was an American baseball minor league player, manager, coach, scout, and instructor, as well as a Major League coach, for the St. Louis Cardinals organization. Born in Evans Mills, New York, he graduated from Evans Mills High School and attended Ithaca College, where he earned both bachelor's and master's degrees in history and physical education. As a player, he stood 5'8" (173 cm) tall and weighed 175 pounds (79 kg). He threw and batted right-handed.

Kissel was inducted into the St. Louis Cardinals Hall of Fame.

Career
Kissell was signed as an infielder in 1940 by Branch Rickey, and spent 69 years with the Cardinals organization. He was primarily a third baseman, although he also played shortstop, and never rose above the Class B level as a player. By 1946, after three seasons in the military during World War II,  he had become a playing manager for the Lawrence Millionaires of the Class B New England League. His most successful season as a manager came in 1950 with the Class B Winston-Salem Cardinals, who won 106 of 153 regular-season games and the Carolina League playoff championship.

Kissell managed in the Cardinal farm system through 1957, scouted for them in 1958–62, then returned to the field as a minor league manager in 1963–67. In 1968, he spent his first season as a roving instructor in the Cardinal system, where his efforts led to the nickname of "the Professor," and his influence is generally regarded as being a major basis for what came to be known as the "Cardinal Way". He mentored a number of major league managers, including Sparky Anderson, Joe Torre, and Tony LaRussa.

In the middle of his long career as a minor league manager and farm system official, Kissell spent seven seasons with the Major League Cardinals (1969–75) as a third-base coach on the staff of skipper Red Schoendienst. In his final decades with St. Louis, he served as field coordinator of system-wide instruction, then senior field coordinator.

Honored for dedication to baseball
Kissell received numerous honors for his work in baseball, including induction into the Missouri Sports Hall of Fame in 2003. In recognition for his years of service to the game, Kissell received the King of Baseball award in 1993 from minor league baseball. In addition, the Cardinals' spring training clubhouse in Jupiter, Florida was named after him during spring training in 2005. The Cardinals organization annually honors a minor league coach with the George Kissell Award. In 2015 Kissel was inducted into the St. Louis Cardinals Hall of Fame.

Said former Cardinal manager Whitey Herzog in 2005, “He is one of those baseball lifers that loves to talk baseball ... George Kissell is the only man I know who can talk for 15 minutes about a ground ball.”

At the age of 88, Kissell died after sustaining injuries in a car accident in Pinellas Park, Florida.

See also
 List of St. Louis Cardinals coaches

References

1920 births
2008 deaths
Baseball coaches from New York (state)
Baseball players from New York (state)
Decatur Commodores players
Hamilton Cardinals players
Hamilton Red Wings (baseball) players
Ithaca College alumni
Lawrence Millionaires players
Lowell Orphans players
Major League Baseball third base coaches
Minor league baseball managers
Mobile Shippers players
Omaha Cardinals players
People from Jefferson County, New York
Road incident deaths in Florida
St. Louis Cardinals coaches
St. Louis Cardinals scouts
Winston-Salem Cardinals players